Callionima juliane is a species of moth in the family Sphingidae, which is known from Peru. It was described by Ulf Eitschberger in 2000.

The larvae possibly feed on Aspidosperma macrocarpa or other Apocynaceae species.

References

J
Sphingidae of South America
Moths described in 2000